Write It in Stone is the debut studio album by American country music artist Keith Harling. Released in 1998 on the MCA Nashville label, it produced four singles: "Papa Bear", "Coming Back for You", the title track, and "There Goes the Neighborhood", all of which charted on the Billboard Hot Country Songs charts, although only "Papa Bear" and "Coming Back for You" reached Top 40. The track "I Never Go Around Mirrors" is a cover of a hit single by Lefty Frizzell which has also been recorded by Keith Whitley.

Track listing

Personnel
 Mark Casstevens – acoustic guitar
 Paul Franklin – pedal steel guitar, Dobro
 Kenny Greenberg – electric guitar
 Jackie Harling – background vocals
 Keith Harling – lead vocals
 John Hughey – pedal steel guitar
 John Barlow Jarvis – piano
 Jerry Kimbrough – acoustic guitar
 Liana Manis – background vocals
 Brent Mason – electric guitar
 Michael Rhodes – bass guitar
 John Wesley Ryles – background vocals
 Joe Spivey – fiddle, mandolin
 Billy Joe Walker, Jr. – acoustic guitar
 Lonnie Wilson – drums, percussion
 Curtis Young — background vocals

Chart performance

References
[ Write It in Stone] at Allmusic

1998 debut albums
Keith Harling albums
MCA Records albums
Albums produced by Wally Wilson